Montojo Island is the predominantly ice-covered rocky island 527 m long in southwest-northeast direction and 140 m wide in the southwest extremity of Biscoe Islands in Antarctica. Its surface area is 4.96 ha.

The feature is named after Frigate Capt. Javier Montojo Salazar (1965-2018), Spanish Navy, who died after falling overboard from the research ship Hespérides in South Bay, Livingston Island. The accident happened while he was a member of the scientific team of a satellite navigation project.

Location
British mapping in 1976.

Maps
 British Antarctic Territory. Scale 1:200000 topographic map. DOS 610 Series, Sheet W 66 66. Directorate of Overseas Surveys, UK, 1976
 Antarctic Digital Database (ADD). Scale 1:250000 topographic map of Antarctica. Scientific Committee on Antarctic Research (SCAR). Since 1993, regularly upgraded and updated

See also
 List of Antarctic and subantarctic islands

Notes

References
 Bulgarian Antarctic Gazetteer. Antarctic Place-names Commission. (details in Bulgarian, basic data in English)

External links
 Montojo Island. Adjusted Copernix satellite image

Islands of the Biscoe Islands
Bulgaria and the Antarctic